Ski jumping at the 2018 Winter Olympics took place between 8 and 19 February 2018. A total of four ski jumping events were held.

Qualification

A maximum of 100 athletes (65 male and 35 female) were allowed to qualify for the ski jumping events. The quotas were allocated using the Olympic Quota Allocation List, which is calculated using the FIS World Cup standings and Continental Cup Standings from seasons 2016–17 and 2017–18 added together.

Competition schedule
The following was the competition schedule for the four ski jumping events.

All times are (UTC+9).

Medal summary

Medal table

Events

Participating nations
A total of 100 athletes from 21 nations (including the IOC's designation of Olympic Athletes from Russia) were scheduled to participate.

References

External links
Official Results Book – Ski Jumping

 
2018
Ski jumping
Winter Olympics
Ski jumping competitions in South Korea